Snell is a masculine given name. Notable people with the name include:

 Snell Patel (born 1993), Indian cricketer
 Snell Putney (1929–2009), American sociologist, environmentalist and author

Masculine given names